Echestratus was a King of ancient Sparta from about 900 to 870 BC. He was a son of king Agis I, and third of the Agiad line of Spartan kings.

In his reign Sparta gained control of  the district of Cynuria on the Argive border. He was the father of Labotas or Leobotes, king of Sparta. His grandson was Doryssus.

Notes

References

9th-century BC Greek people
9th-century BC rulers
Agiad kings of Sparta